Agustín Agualongo (1780–1824) was a commander on the royalist side in the wars for Colombian independence. Of indigenous origin, he was born in the Andean town of San Juan de Pasto. In 1811, he volunteered to fight on the royalist side, and served under the command of Colonel Basilio García and Colonel Francisco González, among others. In 1822, as lieutenant colonel, he was credited with halting the progress of republican forces during the Southern Campaign. In 1823, by now promoted to colonel, he was the losing commander in the Battle of Ibarra, Simón Bolívar's solitary military encounter on Ecuadorean soil.

He was captured and executed in Popayán in 1824, unaware that he had achieved the rank of general. His last words were "Viva el rey!" or "Long live the king!" His remains were interred in a church in Popayán. In 1987, they were taken away by a cell of the guerrilla group M-19 led by Antonio Navarro Wolff. The remains were only returned in 1990.

References

Colombian generals